Yang Se-Keun  (born 8 October 1988) is a South Korean football player who plays for Mokpo City in the National League.

External links
 K-League Player Record 

1988 births
Living people
Association football defenders
South Korean footballers
Jeju United FC players
K League 1 players
Korea National League players
Yonsei University alumni